The Day of the Triffids is a novel by John Wyndham.

The title may also refer to:

The Day of the Triffids (film), the 1962 film version
The Day of the Triffids (1981 TV series), the 1981 television version
The Day of the Triffids (2009 TV series), the 2009 television version